Sliker Cobblestone House is a historic home located at Conesus in Livingston County, New York. It consists of a -story frame structure with a 2-story visually dominant cobblestone portion and 1-story rear shed addition.  It features medium-sized field cobbles set in horizontal rows in its construction. The interior features Federal-style details. Also on the property are four contributing outbuildings: a shed, four privies, and a barn dating to about 1900.

It was listed on the National Register of Historic Places in 2007.

References

Houses on the National Register of Historic Places in New York (state)
Cobblestone architecture
Houses in Livingston County, New York
National Register of Historic Places in Livingston County, New York